Volodymyr Ivanovych Ploskina (25 May 1954 – 10 May 2010) was a Ukrainian professional footballer.

Early life
Ploskina was born on 25 May 1954, and raised in the Zakarpattia Oblast.

Career
Ploskina began his professional career in 1969, before signing with Chornomorets Odesa in 1975. After retiring as a player, Ploskina became a youth coach with Shakhtar Donetsk.

In 1988, he was awarded the Club Loyalty Award for the time spent with Chornomorets Odesa.

Death
Ploskina died on 10 May 2010, aged 55, from undisclosed causes.

References

1954 births
2010 deaths
Soviet footballers
Ukrainian footballers
FC Chornomorets Odesa players
Soviet Top League players
Association footballers not categorized by position